Redmarshall railway station was a railway station on the North Eastern Railway, in County Durham.

History
The station was opened with a section of the Clarence Railway main line in January 1836. When completed, the main line ran between Haverton Hill and Simpasture, where it joined the Stockton and Darlington Railway. After a series of leases and absorptions, the Clarence Railway eventually became part of the North Eastern Railway (NER) upon the formation of the latter in 1854.

On completion of the work, there were four tracks between Stillington Junction and Carlton West Junction; the southern pair carried the freight trains and were electrified, whilst the northern pair carried the passenger trains and remained steam-worked. At Carlton station, the platforms were only on the northern pair of tracks.

On 1 January 1923 the NER amalgamated with other companies to form the London and North Eastern Railway (LNER). On 1 July 1923 the LNER renamed the station Redmarshall.

The line is still in use for freight and occasional diverted passenger trains, but no trace of the station itself remains.

Notes

References

External links
Redmarshall Station on navigable O.S. map

Disused railway stations in the Borough of Stockton-on-Tees
Former North Eastern Railway (UK) stations
Railway stations in Great Britain opened in 1836
Railway stations in Great Britain closed in 1952